Abu Duah (born 5 June 1978) is a Ghanaian sprinter who specializes in the 100 metres. He competed in the 4 × 400 metres relay at the 1996 Summer Olympics and the 2000 Summer Olympics.

Duah finished fifth in 4 x 100 metres relay at the 1997 World Championships, together with teammates Eric Nkansah, Aziz Zakari and Emmanuel Tuffour. This team had set a national record of 38.12 seconds in the semi final heat.

His personal best time on the individual distance is 10.31 seconds, achieved in July 2001 in Arnhem. The Ghanaian record currently belongs to Leonard Myles-Mills with 9.98 seconds.

References

External links

1978 births
Living people
Ghanaian male sprinters
Athletes (track and field) at the 1996 Summer Olympics
Athletes (track and field) at the 2000 Summer Olympics
Olympic athletes of Ghana
20th-century Ghanaian people
21st-century Ghanaian people
World Athletics Championships athletes for Ghana